

Teams and drivers
All cars used Chevrolet Vectra Stock Car chassis. All drivers were Brazilian-registered.

The 2002 Stock Car Brasil was the 26th Stock Car Brasil season.

References

Stock Car Brasil
Stock Car Brasil seasons